SK Partizan or Streljački Klub Partizan is a shooting club from Belgrade, Serbia. The club is part of the sports society JSD Partizan.

The club celebrated its 50th anniversary in 2009.

History
The club was founded on May 27, 1959. The biggest success of the club was when its member got the gold medal at the 1988 Olympics in Seoul, setting the world record on the way.

Honors
The club and its members have achieved significant results over the years...
 Olympic Games - Gold medal with Olympic record by Goran Maksimović 
 World Championships - 3 gold, 3 silver and 4 bronze medals
 Four World Records
 European Championships - 16 gold, 11 silver and 8 bronze medals
 Balkan Championships - 52 gold, 52 silver, and 50 bronze medals
 14 Balkan Records
 Yugoslav Championship - 172 gold medals

For a more detailed list of results per year, between 1996 and 2007 see the official website.

References

External links 
Official Website
Facebook Group Page

Sport in Belgrade
Sports clubs established in 1959